Djibril Ouattara (born 19 September 1999) is a Burkinabé professional footballer who plays as a forward for Moroccan club RS Berkane and the Burkina Faso national team.

Club career
After one season in the third division with Vitesse FC, Ouattara was signed by Burkinabé Premier League club ASF Bobo Dioulasso in 2017. That year, they won the league title and he led all scorers with 15 goals.

International career
Ouattara won a gold medal with the Burkina Faso national under-20 team at the 2019 African Games, where he was the top goalscorer in Pool A.

Career statistics

Club

International

Honours
Bobo Dioulasso
 Burkinabé Premier League: 2017–18

Individual
 Burkinabé Premier League top scorer: 2017–18

References

1999 births
Living people
People from Bobo-Dioulasso
Burkinabé footballers
Association football forwards
Burkina Faso international footballers
Burkina Faso under-20 international footballers
African Games gold medalists for Burkina Faso
African Games medalists in football
Competitors at the 2019 African Games
2021 Africa Cup of Nations players
Burkinabé Premier League players
Botola players
ASF Bobo Dioulasso players
RS Berkane players
Burkinabé expatriate footballers
Burkinabé expatriate sportspeople in Morocco
Expatriate footballers in Morocco
21st-century Burkinabé people
Burkina Faso A' international footballers
2018 African Nations Championship players